Steward Chikandiwa (born 9 September 1984) is a Zambian football striker who currently plays for Nakambala Leopards F.C.

References

1984 births
Living people
Zambian footballers
Zambia international footballers
Young Arrows F.C. players
Lusaka Celtic F.C. players
Nkwazi F.C. players
Green Buffaloes F.C. players
Nakambala Leopards F.C. players
Association football forwards